Richard James Day (17 February 1920 – 5 August 1997) was an Australian rules footballer who played with North Melbourne in the Victorian Football League (VFL).

Notes

External links 

1920 births
Australian rules footballers from Victoria (Australia)
North Melbourne Football Club players
Yarraville Football Club players
1997 deaths